Tucky Buzzard is the second studio album by British hard rock band Tucky Buzzard and their first for Capitol Records. It was produced by the Rolling Stones' bass player Bill Wyman. The album was featured on the band's 2005 compilation album Time Will Be Your Doctor - Rare Recordings 1971-1972 in its entirety.

"Time Will Be Your Doctor" was also recorded by Fuzzy Duck for their self-titled debut album released the same year.

Track listing

Songwriting credits per BMI records. The original album does not provide specific songwriting credits, and instead ambiguously credits all the original songs as "written by Tucky Buzzard", even though some of the tracks were co-written by Paul Francis, who was no longer a member of the group.

Personnel
Tucky Buzzard
Jimmy Henderson - lead vocals
Terry Taylor - guitars
Dave Brown - bass
Chris Johnson - drums
Nicky Graham - keyboards
with:
Mick Taylor - guitar on "My Friend" and "Whiskey Eyes"

References

1971 albums
Tucky Buzzard albums
Capitol Records albums
Albums recorded at Olympic Sound Studios